The FA Women's Football Awards is an award ceremony hosted by The Football Association in England. The inaugural edition took place in 1999.

Top Goalscorer
Below is a list of all the recipients of this award:

Players' Player of the Year

Below is a list of all the recipients of this award:

International Young Player of the Year
Below is a list of all the recipients of this award:

International Player of the Year

Below is a list of all the recipients of this award:

Note: this category became a part of the England Player of the Year Awards from 2019 onwards.

Head Coach / Manager of the Year

Below is a list of all the recipients of this award:

Club of the Year

Below is a list of all the recipients of this award:

Goal of the Year
Below is a list of all the recipients of this award:

Save of the Year
Below is a list of all the recipients of this award:

Goalkeeper of the Year

Below is a list of all the recipients of this award:

Special Achievement Award

Below is a list of all the recipients of this award:

Fan of the Year
Below is a list of all the recipients of this award:

Participation Award
Below is a list of all the recipients of this award:

Unsung Hero Award
Below is a list of all the recipients of this award:

FA WSL All Star Team
Below is a list of all the recipients of this award:

See also

 List of sports awards honoring women
 FA WSL Golden Boot

References

External links
 

English football trophies and awards
Awards established in 1999
1999 establishments in England
Women's Football Awards
Annual events in England
Annual sporting events in the United Kingdom
Women's Super League awards
Women's Championship (England) awards
FA Women's National League awards
England women's national football team
English women's football trophies and awards